Harmadih (also spelled Harmadi) is a village in the Neturia CD block in the Raghunathpur subdivision of the Purulia district in the state of West Bengal, India.

Geography

Location

Area overview
Purulia district forms the lowest step of the Chota Nagpur Plateau. The general scenario is undulating land with scattered hills. Raghunathpur subdivision occupies the northern part of the district. 83.80% of the population of the subdivision  lives in rural areas. However, there are pockets of urbanization and 16.20% of the population lives in urban areas. There are 14 census towns in the subdivision. It is presented in the map given alongside. There is a coal mining area around Parbelia and two thermal power plants are there – the 500 MW Santaldih Thermal Power Station and the 1200 MW Raghunathpur Thermal Power Station. The subdivision has a rich heritage of old temples, some of them belonging to the 11th century or earlier. The Banda Deul is a monument of national importance. The comparatively more recent in historical terms, Panchkot Raj has interesting and intriguing remains in the area.

Note: The map alongside presents some of the notable locations in the subdivision. All places marked in the map are linked in the larger full screen map.

Demographics
According to the 2011 Census of India, Harmadi had a total population of 205, of which 102 (50%) were males and 103 (50%) were females. There were 30 persons in the age range of 0–6 years. The total number of literate persons in Harmadi was 93 (53.14% of the population over 6 years).

Education
Panchakot Mahavidyalaya was established in 2001 at Sarbari.

Culture
Garh Panchkot is a ruined 16th century fort/ palace of the Panchkot Raj at the foot of the Panchet Hill.

Achkoda, located in this block, showcases aatchala-style temples with terracotta work on the walls.  It “seems to be at least five centuries old. Its panels are smaller in size and some of them depict tribal life.”

Healthcare
Harmadih Rural Hospital, with 30 beds at Harmadih, is the major government medical facility in the Neturia CD block.

References

Villages in Purulia district